Aulacophora dorsalis is a species of beetles in the family Chrysomelidae.

Description
The basic color of these beetles is yellowish, with two black transversal bars at the top and bottom of the elytra.

Distribution
This species is native to Southeast Asia.

References

D
Beetles described in 1835
Beetles of Asia